The 22935/22936 Bandra Terminus–Palitana Express is a Express train belonging to Western Railway zone that runs between  and  in India. It is currently being operated with 22935/22936 train numbers on a weekly basis.

Service

22935/Bandra Terminus–Palitana Express has an average speed of 56 km/hr and covers 786 km in 14h 05m.
22936/Palitana–Bandra Terminus Express has an average speed of 55 km/hr and covers 786 km in 14h 15m.

Route and halts 
The important halts of the train are:

Schedule

Coach composition
The train has standard LHB rakes with max speed of 110 kmph. The train consists of 20 coaches:
 1 AC II Tier
 3 AC III Tier
 10 Sleeper coaches
 1 Pantry car
 3 General Unreserved
 2 End-on Generator

Rake sharing
The train shares its rake with  19041/19042 Bandra Terminus–Ghazipur City Weekly Express.

Direction reversal

Traction
As the route is now fully electrified, it is hauled by a Vadodara Loco Shed-based WAP-7 electric locomotive from Bandra Terminus to Palitana railway station.

See also 
 Palitana railway station
 Bandra Terminus railway station

Notes

References 

Transport in Mumbai
Express trains in India
Rail transport in Maharashtra
Rail transport in Gujarat
Railway services introduced in 2014